In baseball statistics, an error is an act, in the judgment of the official scorer, of a fielder misplaying a ball in a manner that allows a batter or baserunner to advance one or more bases or allows an at bat to continue after the batter should have been put out. The pitcher is the player who pitches the baseball from the pitcher's mound toward the catcher to begin each play, with the goal of retiring a batter, who attempts to either make contact with the pitched ball or draw a walk. The pitcher is often considered the most important player on the defensive side of the game, playing the most difficult and specialized position, and as such is regarded as being at the right end of the defensive spectrum. Pitchers play far less than players at other positions, generally appearing in only two or three games per week; only one pitcher in major league history has appeared in 100 games in a single season. There are many different types of pitchers, generally divided between starting pitchers and relief pitchers, which include the middle reliever, lefty specialist, setup man, and closer. In the scoring system used to record defensive plays, the pitcher is assigned the number 1.

The list of career leaders is dominated by players from the 19th century when fielding equipment was very rudimentary; baseball gloves only began to steadily gain acceptance in the 1880s, and were not uniformly worn until the mid-1890s, resulting in a much lower frequency of defensive miscues. The top 25 players in career errors began playing in the 19th century, most of them playing their entire careers before 1900; only four were active after 1901, none after 1911. Most of the top 92 played entirely in the 19th century, with only 19 making their major league debut after 1900; only six made their debut after 1940. The top 16 single-season totals were all recorded before 1890, the top 95 were recorded before 1904, and the top 297 were recorded before 1924. To a large extent, the leaders reflect longevity rather than lower skill. Jim Kaat and Greg Maddux, whose error totals of 56 and 53 rank fifth and seventh among pitchers since 1940, won sixteen and eighteen Gold Glove Awards respectively for defensive excellence.

Bobby Mathews is the all-time leader in career errors committed by a pitcher with 220, more than twice as many as any pitcher who began playing after 1900; he is the only pitcher to commit more than 200 career errors. Tim Keefe is second with 166 career errors as a pitcher. A total of seventeen players have committed more than 100 career errors as pitchers. Justin Verlander, who had 34 errors through the 2022 season to place him tied for 234th all-time, is the leader among active players.

Key

List

Other Hall of Famers

References

Baseball-Reference.com

Major League Baseball statistics
Major League Baseball lists